is a Japanese dish made with monkfish liver. 

The liver is first rubbed with salt, then rinsed with sake. Then its veins are picked out and the liver is rolled into a cylinder and steamed. Ankimo is often served with momiji-oroshi (chili-tinted grated daikon), thinly sliced scallions and ponzu sauce.

Ankimo is considered one of the chinmi (delicacies) of Japan. It is listed at number 32 on The World's 50 Best Foods compiled by CNN Go.

Preparations 
Ankimo is most often consumed outside of Japan as sushi or sashimi. Inside Japan, ankimo is used in several meibutsu, regional delicacies, such as dobu-jiru, stewed ankimo and vegetables from Fukushima.

See Also 
 Chinmi
 Meibutsu

References

External links
 Liver of the monkfish: a controversial delicacy

Japanese seafood